Caitlin Shaw (born August 28, 1989) is an American professional stock car racing driver.

Shaw is the second youngest woman to compete in NASCAR's top three series (behind Johanna Robbins). She is also the only woman from the state of New Mexico to ever compete in any of NASCAR's top three series. Shaw was the inaugural United States Spokeswoman for the International Online Magazine GirlRacer.co.uk. She continues to promote women in sports by visiting multiple children's hospitals, schools, and seminars talking with children about the power of sport.

Racing career

Early career
Shaw's early career began in 1999 when she began competing in the Quarter Midget's of America organization. Shaw transitioned into the USAC (United States Auto Club) ranks beginning in the Ford Focus Midget Series where she was Sportsman of the Year and competed in events coast to coast. In 2008 Shaw gained speed in her career as she was offered her first NASCAR Camping World Truck Series Test with Toyota Racing Development's Germain Racing. Shaw tested alongside A. J. Allmendinger, Todd Bodine, and Chrissy Wallace. Later that year Shaw tested at Richmond International Raceway with another Toyota Racing Development team, Red Horse Racing.

NASCAR Camping World Truck Series
Shaw competed in the NASCAR Whelen All American Series in the spring of 2009 accumulating several top-ten finishes. In July 2009, Shaw was the only woman on the track as she made her NASCAR Camping World Truck Series debut at O'Reilly Raceway Park. Shaw completed the race in the 24th position.

Shaw continued her NCWTS career in November 2010 racing at Phoenix International Raceway for DGM Racing.

Personal life
Her hometown is in Albuquerque, New Mexico. Shaw is a student at Belmont Abbey College in North Carolina pursuing a degree in Marketing. She is currently working part-time at Michael Waltrip Racing, working in their Communications and Marketing departments.

Motorsports career results

NASCAR
(key) (Bold – Pole position awarded by qualifying time. Italics – Pole position earned by points standings or practice time. * – Most laps led.)

Camping World Truck Series

References

External links
 
 

Living people
1989 births
Racing drivers from Albuquerque, New Mexico
NASCAR drivers
American female racing drivers
21st-century American women